The LAZAR is a series of armed personnel carriers, designed for various applications and missions, designed and developed by Yugoimport-SDPR. There are 3 versions of Lazar family of armoured vehicles: Lazar 1, Lazar 2, and Lazar 3.

Lazar 2

Design
The Multi-Role Armored Vehicle Lazar 2 8×8 is based on modifications of the concept and the technical solutions implemented on the functional model of Lazar vehicle. These modifications are carried on with the purpose to further harmonize the basic characteristic of the vehicle with contemporary international trends in the development of families of multi-role armored wheel-type vehicles. The concept of the first Lazar vehicle represented a combination of the characteristics of MRAP and MRAV (Multirole Armoured Vehicle) type vehicles, while the Lazar 2 is closer to the MRAV concept first of all because of the introduction of independent suspension, which allows the platform to be customized to different roles. The concept provides for installation of different types of weapon turrets depending on the purpose of the vehicle.

The vehicle is equipped with a rear ramp for easier entrance and exit, and has two doors embedded within that ramp for emergency situations. It also features a separate door for the driver and commander, located on the driver side.
It features five bullet proof windows and firing ports on each side of the vehicle, as well as two on the rear of the vehicle. This allows the troops inside the vehicle to have a high situational awareness and to engage targets from inside the safety of the vehicle.
The driver has five cameras, which provide him with a near 360° field of visibility. Two are located in front of the driver's hatch, two are covering the sides of the vehicle, and one is installed in the rear of the vehicle to aid with reverse driving.
In the IFV configuration, it seats three crew members and nine troops.

Mobility
The vehicle is powered by a 500 hp engine and features independent suspension for each of its 8×8 powered wheels, ensuring high mobility even in rough terrain. France's Texelis supplied axles and suspension systems to Yugoimport for the 8×8 Lazar 2 and 3 APCs (T900 suspension with 24 vehicle sets delivered) and the 4×4 Milosh APC (T700 suspension with 12 vehicle sets delivered) with potential for additional orders.

Protection

Ballistic protection 
Armored body of Lazar 2 presents modular construction, with possibilities of different level of protection, according to the needs of the user. Basic level of armored protection, without add-on armor corresponds to level III+ (12.7×99mm at 30m) at the front side of the vehicle, and level III (7.62×54mmR at 30m) on all other sides in accordance to NATO STANAG.

With adding of additional composite armor over the basic armor of Lazar 2, protection goes up to level V (25 mm APDS-T at 500m) at the front of the vehicle, and level IV on all other sides.

M91 30mm turret (Vidra) provides level IV (14.5×114mm at 200m) protection at the front glacis, and level III (7.62×54mmR at 30m) on the sides of the turret, with add-on armour being available for further protection.

Additional slat armor can provide protection against RPG missiles.

Mine protection 
Anti-mine protection is provided with use of double layer, V-shaped steel floor, and additional steel plates under the seats, which are attached to the roof of the vehicle. This provides anti-mine protection of level IIa under any wheel, and level IIb under the center of the vehicle in accordance to NATO STANAG.

Smoke screen protection 
Vehicle has few smoke grenade launchers which provide Smoke screen used to mask movement from enemy's units and weapons.

Special features 
These features can be selected from by a potential buyer.
Air conditioning with compressor and overpressure system for CBRN protection
15W VHF radio with UMR
Interlinked Command Information System with such features as encrypted communications, GPS maps, in-action battle plan modification etc.
Remote Controlled Weapons Station with armament ranging from 12,7mm to 30mm, including a full sensor loadout stabilized in two planes with LIDAR, IR, thermal and optical devices.

Lazar 3

Main differences between Lazar 2 and Lazar 3 are:
new better modular armour design with possibilities of inserting Spall liner
if turret is mounted instead 12.7mm RCWS crew is made of 2 and 8 soldiers are carried
width is increased and now is 2.95m
Maximum speed is increased to 110 km/h
Main basic protection from all sides is increased and it's now STANAG 4569 level 3
Main anti-mine protection is increased and it's now STANAG 4569 level 3a and 3b
Add-on ballistic protection STANAG 4569 can be up to level 5 on front side
New features can be selected from by a potential buyer like automatic fire extinguisher

There are many other improvements and modifications done on Lazar 3 over Lazar 2 such as: improved lids and one more lid for engine compartment and a new lid for maintenance on right side of vehicle. Front and back light groups are different, video system for driving is now in protective housing, side windows now have wipers, side mirrors are different, suspension is from other supplier thus improving maximal speed, seats in back compartment are better, it is possible to open rear ramp with a pres of a button from drivers compartment, smoke grenade launcher is now on roof, etc.

In March 2017 entered service with Serbia in the armoured personnel carrier role.

Production
Manufacturing is organized through Yugoimport SDPR subsidiary, Borbeni složeni sistemi ("Complex Fighting Systems"), at its facilities in Velika Plana. Initial production batch of Lazar 3 with 12.7mm machine gun remote weapon station was delivered to Serbian Gendarmery.

Operators 

Serbian Army – 6 Lazar 2 (delivered in 2018), 30 Lazar 3 (delivered between 2019 and 2022); announced plan, based on the study of the  Department for Planning and Development of Serbian General Staff
 Gendarmery – 2 (version with 12.7 mm gun)
 – 3 Lazar 2 on order

Gallery

References 

Wheeled armoured personnel carriers
Armoured personnel carriers of Serbia
Eight-wheeled vehicles
Armoured personnel carriers of the post–Cold War period